
Year 402 BC was a year of the pre-Julian Roman calendar. At the time, it was known as the Year of the Tribunate of Ahala, Cornutus, Fidenas, Capitolinus, Esquilinus and Fidenas (or, less frequently, year 352 Ab urbe condita). The denomination 402 BC for this year has been used since the early medieval period, when the Anno Domini calendar era became the prevalent method in Europe for naming years.

Events 
<onlyinclude>

By place

Greece 
 Archelaus I, King of Macedonia, helps establish a pro-Macedonian oligarchy in Larissa in Thessaly.

Births 
 Phocion, Athenian statesman and general (d. c. 318 BC)

Deaths 
 Zhou wei lie wang, King of the Zhou Dynasty of China

References